Shannon Courtenay (born 3 July 1993) is a British professional boxer who  held the WBA female bantamweight title between April and October 2021.

Professional career
Courtenay made her professional debut on 23 March 2019, scoring a four-round points decision (PTS) victory over Cristina Busuioc at the Copper Box Arena in London. The fight was televised live on Sky Sports as part of the undercard for Charlie Edwards' world title defense against Angel Moreno.

One month later she defeated Roz Mari Silyanova via four-round points decision on 23 April. The fight was streamed live on Sky Sports' Facebook page as part of the preliminary undercard for Dave Allen vs. Lucas Browne at The O2 Arena, London. In June, she stopped Valerija Sepetovska by technical knockout (TKO) at 1 minute 16 seconds in the second-round of a scheduled six-round bout held at the York Hall. Her next fight was a four-round points win over Jasmina Nad on 26 October as part of the undercard for the Josh Taylor vs. Regis Prograis world title fight, held at The O2 Arena. Courtenay's final fight of 2019 came on 19 December, scoring a fifth-round TKO over Buchra El Quaissi at the York Hall.

Her first fight of 2020 came against Rachel Ball on 14 August at the Matchroom Sport headquarters in Brentwood, Essex. In a fight which saw Courtenay dropped to the canvas by a left hook in the first round, she went on to suffer her first professional defeat, losing on points over eight rounds, with the referee scoring the bout 77–75.

She bounced back from defeat with a TKO victory against Dorota Norek in December, before facing Ebanie Bridges for the vacant WBA female bantamweight title. The bout took place on 10 April 2021 at the Copper Box Arena. In a fight which saw Courtenay hurt her opponent with a right hand in the fifth round while also causing Bridges' eye to close through swelling by the ninth, Courtenay emerged victorious via ten-round unanimous decision (UD). Two judges scored the bout 98–92 and the third judge scored it 97–94.

In July it was announced that Courtenay will make the first defence of her title against Jamie Mitchell on 14 August at the Matchroom Sport Headquarters. The fight was postponed after Courtenay suffered an injury in training and was forced to withdraw. The fight was rescheduled for October 9, 2021 on Smith vs Fowler card in Liverpool, England.

On 8 October 2021, Courtenay failed to make weight for her fight with Jamie Mitchell and was stripped of her WBA Bantamweight World Title.

Professional boxing record

References

External links

Living people
1993 births
English women boxers
Sportspeople from Hertfordshire
Super-bantamweight boxers
World bantamweight boxing champions
World Boxing Association champions